Anselmo Gouthier (19 June 1933 – 1 November 2015) was an Italian politician. From 1979–1984 Gouthier served as a Member of the European Parliament (MEP), representing Italy for the Communist Party
From 1983–1984, Gouthier served as Vice-Chair of the Delegation for relations with Yugoslavia

References

2015 deaths
1933 births
Politicians from Turin
Italian Communist Party MEPs
MEPs for Italy 1979–1984
People from Roure, Piedmont